Yachi is a surname. Notable people with the surname include:

Kento Yachi (born 1988), Japanese baseball player
Shotaro Yachi (born 1944), Japanese diplomat
Yusuke Yachi (born 1980), Japanese race walker

Fictional
Hitoka Yachi, the second manager of the Karasuno High School Volleyball Club in Haikyu!!
Madoka Yachi, a mother of Hitoka Yachi in Haikyū!!